Dockery Lake is a lake in Mason County, Michigan, in the United States.

Dockery Lake derives its name from a doctor who settled near it.

See also
List of lakes in Michigan

References

Lakes of Michigan
Bodies of water of Mason County, Michigan